Pachygnatha xanthostoma is a species of long-jawed orb weaver in the spider family Tetragnathidae. It is found in the United States and Canada.

References

External links

 

Tetragnathidae
Articles created by Qbugbot
Spiders described in 1845